Diploidization is the process of converting a polyploid genome back into a diploid one. Polyploidy is a product of whole genome duplication (WGD) and is followed by diploidization as a result of genome shock. The plant kingdom has undergone multiple events of polyploidization followed by diploidization in both ancient and recent lineages. It has also been hypothesized that vertebrate genomes have gone through two rounds of paleopolyploidy. The mechanisms of diploidization are poorly understood but patterns of chromosomal loss and evolution of novel genes are observed in the process.

Elimination of duplicated genes 

Upon the formation of new polyploids, large sections of DNA are rapidly lost from one genome. The loss of DNA effectively achieves two purposes. First, the eliminated copy restores the normal gene dosage in the diploid organism. Second, the changes in chromosomal genetic structure increase the divergence of the homoeologous chromosomes (similar chromosomes from inter-species hybrid) and promotes homologous chromosome pairing. Both are important in terms of adjusting to the induced genome shock.

Evolution of genes to ensure correct chromosome pairing 

There have been rare events in which genes that ensure proper chromosome pairing have evolved shortly after polyploidization. One such gene, Ph1, exists in hexaploid wheat. These genes keep the two sets of genomes separately by either spatially separating them or giving them a unique chromatin identity to facilitate recognition from its homologous pair. This prevents the need of rapid gene loss to speed up homeologous chromosome diversification.

Drive for diploidization 
 Coordinate inter-genomic gene expression
 Duplicated genes often result in increased dosage of gene products. Doubled dosages are sometimes lethal to the organism thus the two genome copies must coordinate in a structured fashion to maintain normal nuclear activity. Many mechanisms of diploidization promote this coordination.
 Maintain intra-genomic chromosome pairing at meiosis
 Chromosome pairing during meiosis is a significant challenge for polyploids. Homoeologous chromosomes with similar genetic content may pair with each other resulting in trivalent or tetravalent interactions. The resolution of these structures results in chromosome breakage, rearrangement, and gamete infertility. Diploidization is often required to restore the cell’s ability to stably go through meiosis.
 Reduce costs of maintaining large, duplicated genomes
 Large genomes are costly to synthesize during replication and hard to maintain. The loss of duplicated genes during diploidization effectively reduces the overall size of the genome.

Revolutionary vs. evolutionary changes 
Once a polyploid is made, either synthetically or naturally, the genome goes through a period of "genome shock". Genome shock can be defined as a stage in which the genome experiences massive reorganization and structural changes to deal with the external stress (X-ray damage, chromosome duplication, etc.) imposed upon the genome. Such changes are termed revolutionary changes and occur early in the process of diploidization. Revolutionary changes ensure that the organism has a stable genome that can be passed to its progeny.

At the end of this process, certain duplicated genes may be preserved thus allowing evolution to shape them into novel functions. This is commonly termed as neofunctionalization. The mechanism of retaining duplicated genes is poorly understood. It has been hypothesized that dosage balance may play a key role in shaping the evolutionary fates of duplicated genes. Evolutionary changes refer to the long process of converting duplicated genes into diverse, functional gene derivatives.

Mechanisms 
There are many ways in which a polyploid organism can convert back to a diploid status. This is usually achieved by elimination of duplicated genes. The main goals of diploidization are: (1) To ensure proper gene dosage; and (2) to maintain stable cellular division processes. This process does not need to occur rapidly for all chromosomes in one or few steps. In recent polyploid events, segments of the genome may still remain in a tetraploid status. In other words, diploidization is a long ongoing process that is shaped by both intrinsic and evolutionary drives.

Abnormal chromosome pairing 
Normally, homologous chromosomes pair up in bivalents during meiosis and separate into different daughter cells. However, when multiple copies of similar chromosomes are present in the nucleus, homeologous chromosomes can also pair with homologous chromosomes resulting in the formation of trivalents or multivalents. The formation of multivalents results in unequal division of the chromosomes and lead to daughter cells lacking one or few chromosomes.

Illegitimate recombination 
When homeologous chromosomes pair up though bivalents or multivalents, illegitimate genetic crossovers may occur. Since the chromosomes may differ in genetic structure and content, segments of the chromosome may be shuffled around resulting in massive gene loss. Additionally, illegitimate recombinations may also result in dicentric chromosomes lead to chromosome breakage during anaphase. This further contributes to gene loss on duplicated chromosomes.

Relaxed selective pressure on duplicated genes 
The duplicated copies of a gene are commonly non-essential to the plant’s ability to maintain normal growth and development. Therefore, one copy is generally free to mutate/be lost from the genome. This contributes to gene loss through the massive chromosome reorganization events during genome shock.

Neofunctionalization 
As mentioned earlier, duplicated genes are under relaxed selective pressure. Thus it may also be subject to neofunctionalization, the process in which a duplicated gene obtains a novel function.

See also 
 Polyploidy
 Paleopolyploidy
 Neofunctionalization

References 

Classical genetics
Speciation